The Albany Great Danes men's soccer team represents the University at Albany, SUNY in NCAA Division I men's soccer competitions. The Great Danes compete in the America East Conference.

Seasons

Division I 

Albany joined Division I in 1999 and spent two years as an independent before joining the America East Conference. Albany played in Division III and Division II from 1950 until 1998.

NCAA tournament results 

Albany has appeared in two NCAA tournaments.

References 
 http://www.americaeast.com/fls/14000/records/MSOC.pdf?DB_OEM_ID=14000
 https://admin.xosn.com/pdf9/4895054.pdf?DB_OEM_ID=15800

External links
 

 
1950 establishments in New York (state)
Association football clubs established in 1950